is a vertical platform game developed by Hardlight and published by Sega for iOS and Android. On its original release, the app was released in Japan on February 21, 2005, and then North America United States, South America, resume Asia, Africa, and Europe UK worldwide in April 2007. It was then remade and released worldwide on iOS as a paid download on 18 October 2012, and then released for Android on 21 December 2012.

In April 2014, a sequel to this game was released on iOS and Android devices, entitled Sonic Jump Fever.

Gameplay
While games in the Sonic the Hedgehog series commonly involve running from side to side, Sonic Jump involves no running, but rather, Sonic jumping through the stages vertically to get to the top of the stage. The player controls Sonic by tilting the device left or right. Sonic jumps automatically, though a "double jump" move can be used upon tapping the touchscreen. Rings are collected throughout the stages, and accumulated rings can be used to purchase further content in the game, such as items, upgrades, or additional playable characters. Players can "level up" by achieving certain objectives in each stage; increasing the player's level will allow access to new content for purchase.

The game contains two play modes; "Story Mode", which has preset stages with an end goal, and "Arcade Mode", which has randomly created stages that go on endlessly, with the purpose being to make it as far as possible through the stage.

Development
The game is a remake of a 2005 Sonic game of the same name. The original version of the game was developed by Sega Mobile for the T-Mobile Sidekick phone, and only contained six stages.

The new version of the game was first teased by Sega on October 5, 2012. It was then announced and released less than two weeks later on October 18, 2012. The game's first update, containing the "Blue Sky Zone" of twelve new stages, a new playable character (Amy Rose) was released on November 26, 2012. This update also included a new "Global Challenge" mode, which pools in all player's gameplay height results, with the end goal being able to match the equivalent distance of Earth to the Moon. Completing the global challenge would unlock another character, Blaze the Cat. Another update was released on December 19, 2012, adding Rouge the Bat and Silver the Hedgehog as playable characters, and replaced the sixth stage from each zone with a Boss Act.

The game was released for Android on December 21, 2012.

Reception
Reception for the 2012 remake game has been mostly positive. Pocket Gamer gave the game an 8 out of 10, praising it for being a "...tough, entertaining vertical platformer that has enough references and stylistic tweaks to make it stand out from the crowd". Slide to Play gave the game a 4 out of 4 "Must Play" rating, especially praising the value in the game's free updates, stating: "Twelve new stages and a new playable character adds up to a meaty chunk of content, and we're glad to see this excellent game get continued love from the developers. They even say advertise another forthcoming update in the game, and we're looking forward to playing that as well. Sonic Jump remains a great buy." IGN gave the game a 7.5 out of 10, praising the game's "quality presentation and solid challenge" and that "the difficulty ramps up at a surprisingly fast pace...like the cutesy climbing equivalent of Super Meat Boy", but criticized Sega's approach to buying unlockables, saying that it takes too long to unlock by gameplay alone, and that buying one's way through the game destroys the competitive aspect of the leaderboards. The game has also received many comparisons to the game Doodle Jump.

However, reception for the original, 2005 version was less positive. IGN gave the game a 5 out of 10 score, stating the game was "not engaging and "dull" and that "controls seemed sluggish and occasionally inaccurate".

On iOS, the game hit over 8.8million downloads (including free DLs) in North America and Europe after five months, as of March 2013.

Sonic Jump Fever
A sequel to Sonic Jump, entitled Sonic Jump Fever, was released for iOS and Android worldwide on 10 July 2014.

Notes

References

2005 video games
Windows games
2012 video games
Android (operating system) games
IOS games
Mobile games
Platform games
Sega video games
Side-scrolling video games
Video games developed in the United Kingdom
Sonic the Hedgehog spin-off games
Video games developed in Japan